The Criminal Procedure Act, 1977 (Act No. 51 of 1977) is an act of the Parliament of South Africa that governs criminal procedure in South Africa's legal system. It details the procedure for the whole system of criminal law, including search and seizure, arrest, the filing of charges, bail, the plea, the testimony of witnesses and the  law of evidence, the verdict and sentence, and appeal.

The act is also in force in Namibia, which inherited it from the South African administration of South-West Africa. Administration of the act was transferred to the SWA government in 1979, and since then the South African and Namibian versions have diverged through amendment. A new Namibian Criminal Procedure Act was passed in 2004 but has not yet come into force.

See also
 Criminal procedure in South Africa
 National Forensic DNA Database of South Africa
 South African criminal law

External links
 Criminal Procedure Act, 1977, of South Africa, as amended
 Criminal Procedure Act, 1977, of Namibia, as amended

South African legislation
Law of Namibia
1977 in South African law